Shadowline is an American comic book company and an imprint of Image Comics.

Titles

A
 Accelerate (2007)
 After the Cape (2007)
 Aletheia (2008)
 Archibald Saves Christmas (2007)
 Archibald Saves Easter (2008)
 Archibald Chases the Dragon (2009)

B
 Badger vol. 2 (1997)
 Blacklight (2005)
 Bomb Queen: Royal Flush (2006)
 Bomb Queen II: Queen of Hearts (2006)
 Bomb Queen III: The Good, the Bad and the Lovely (2007)
 Bomb Queen IV: Suicide Bomber (2007)
 Bomb Queen V: The Divine Comedy (2008)
 Bomb Queen vs. Blacklight: Cat Fight (2005)
 Bomb Queen Presents: All Girl Comics (2009)
 Bruce: The Little Blue Spruce (2008)

C
 Cemetery Blues (2008)
 Cowboy Ninja Viking (2009)

D
 Dear Dracula (2008)
 DNAgents (2008)
 Drawing From Life (2007)

E
 Eddy Current (2008; hardcover)
 Emissary (2006)
 Evil and Malice (2009; Silverline)

F

G
 Graveslinger (2007)
 Gutwrencher (2008)

H
 Heathentown (2009)
 Hiding in Time (2007)

I
 I Hate Gallant Girl (2008)
 In Her Darkest Hour (2007)
 Intimidators (comics) (2005)

J
 Johnny Monster (2009)

K
 Kamikazi Blacktop

L
 Lazarus (2007)

M
 Metropol (hardcover)
 Missing the Boat (2008)
 Morning Glories (2010)
 M-Theory (2008)

N
 New World Order (2008)
 Normalman 20th Anniversary Special (2004)
 The Complete Normalman (2007)

O
 Overlook (2009)

P
 The Pact (2005)
 Parade (with Fireworks) (2007)
 Peter Panzerfaust (2012)
 Platinum Grit (2009)
 Pretty, Baby, Machine (2008)
 PX! A Girl and Her Panda (2007)
 PX! vol. 2 (2008)

Q

R
 Rat Queens
 Reckers
 The Return of ShadowHawk (2004)
 The Roberts (2008)
 Runes of Ragnan (2005)

S
 Savage (2008)
 Sam Noir: Ronin Holiday (2007)
 Sam Noir: Samurai Detective (2006)
 Second Chance at Sarah
 ShadowHawk (1992)
 ShadowHawk II (1993)
 ShadowHawk III (1993; reverts to ShadowHawk)
 ShadowHawk (2004; ashcan)
 ShadowHawk vol. 2 (2005)
 ShadowHawk vol. 3 (2010)
 Small Gods (2005)
 The Surreal Adventures of Edgar Allan Poo: Book 1 (2007)
 The Surreal Adventures of Edgar Allan Poo: Book 2 (2008; Silverline)

T
 T. Runt! (2009; Silverline)
 Task Force One (2006)
 Tasty Bullet (2009; OGN)
 The Lava Is a Floor (2009; Silverline)
 Tiffany's Epiphany (2009; Silverline)
 Timothy and the Transgalactic Towel (Silverline)
 Transit (2008; hardcover)

U
 Urban Monsters (2008)

V
 Vignettes: The Director's Cut (2008)
 Vix! (2008)

W
Ward of the State (2007)

X

Y

Z
 Zombie Cop'' (2009)

References

External links

 
Shadowline